C. S. Puttaraju is an Indian politician belonging to the Janata Dal (Secular) party. He was a two time MLA from Pandavapura constituency in Karnataka, from 2004 to 2013. In the 2014 Indian General Election, he defeated incumbent Indian National Congress candidate Ramya and  became a member of the 16th Lok Sabha representing Mandya in Karnataka. In 2018, he was elected to Karnataka Vidhan Sabha for the third time, and vacated his Lok Sabha seat.  He is the MLA of Melukote Constituency.

References

Living people
India MPs 2014–2019
People from Mandya district
Janata Dal (Secular) politicians
Lok Sabha members from Karnataka
1964 births
Karnataka MLAs 2008–2013